Wilhelmus Paul Karel ("Willy") Wilhelm (born 16 September 1958 in 's-Hertogenbosch) is a Dutch former Judoka. He represented his country at the 1984 Summer Olympics in Los Angeles. He lost in the first round in the over 95 kg category. He was more successful at the World Judo Championships where he got silver in 1983 in the over 95 kg category and bronze in 1985 in the open category.

References

External links
 

1958 births
Living people
Dutch male judoka
Judoka at the 1984 Summer Olympics
Sportspeople from 's-Hertogenbosch
Olympic judoka of the Netherlands